Comorella is a monotypic genus of East African dwarf spiders containing the single species, Comorella spectabilis. It was first described by R. Jocqué in 1985, and has only been found in Comoros.

See also
 List of Linyphiidae species

References

Linyphiidae
Monotypic Araneomorphae genera
Spiders of Africa